Magnus (III), son of Gille Brigte, was Earl of Orkney in 1256–1273.

Magnus (II)
13th-century mormaers
Place of birth unknown
Place of death unknown